The Prince Philip Challenge Trophy formerly the Junior Women's Eights is a rowing event for women's eights at the annual Henley Royal Regatta on the River Thames at Henley-on-Thames in England. It is open to female junior crews from all eligible clubs or secondary schools and rowers who are still juniors (under 18).  From 2022 the trophy changed its name from the Junior Women's Eight to the Prince Philip Challenge Trophy.

Winners

References

Events at Henley Royal Regatta
Rowing trophies and awards